Ilir Berisha (born 25 June 1991) is a Kosovan professional footballer who plays as a centre-back for Swedish club Ljungskile.

Club career

Örebro
On 19 February 2012, Berisha signed a multi-year contract with Allsvenskan club Örebro and received squad number 5. On 13 May 2012, he was named as a Örebro substitute for the first time in a league match against Norrköping. His debut with Örebro came three days later in a 2–2 home draw against AIK after being named in the starting line-up. On 9 July 2012, he scored his first goal in a 2–1 home win over Malmö.

He finished the 2012 season with a total of 20 appearances (including one made it in the Swedish Cup), in where 18 was as a starter and also with a total of 3 goals. However his performance and goals weren't enough, as the team were relegated to Superettan.

2013 season
On 15 April 2013, Berisha commenced his second season with a win in league match against GIF Sundsvall after coming on as a substitute at 81st minute in place of Ayanda Nkili. One month later, he scored his first goal at season in a 2–0 home win over Degerfors.

The latest match of the 2013 season was on 26 June 2013 against Ljungskile finished in the victory 1–0, as Berisha injured and finished the season, where he registered a total of 12 appearances and scoring 1 goal, and the team gained promotion to the Allsvenskan after they were placed as runners-up.

2014 season
On 25 April 2014, Berisha was named as a Örebro substitute for the first time after return from 10-months injury in a league match against Åtvidaberg. On 30 May 2014, he played the first game after the return against Djurgården after coming on as a substitute at 71st minute in place of Ayanda Nkili.

On 31 October 2014, Berisha announced that will left Örebro at the end of the season. One day later, he played his last match for Örebro against Häcken after coming on as a substitute at 89th minute in place of Magnus Wikström.

Gefle
On 23 March 2015, Berisha signed a two-year contract with Allsvenskan club Gefle. Thirteen days later, he was named as a Gefle substitute for the first time in a league match against Falkenberg. His debut with Gefle came three days later in a 2–0 home win against Kalmar after coming on as a substitute at last minutes in place of Johan Bertilsson.

Flamurtari
On 13 January 2016, Berisha joined Kategoria Superiore side Flamurtari. On 7 September 2016, he made his debut in a 2–1 away defeat against Skënderbeu Korçë after being named in the starting line-up.

Västerås
On 24 July 2017, Berisha signed a one-year and a half contract with Ettan club Västerås. One month later, he made his debut in a 1–0 away defeat against Brage after being named in the starting line-up.

Feronikeli
On 13 December 2019, Berisha joined Football Superleague of Kosovo side Feronikeli. Two months later, he made his debut with Feronikeli in 2019–20 Kosovar Cup quarter-final against Liria after being named in the starting line-up.

International career
Berisha received Albanian citizenship on 24 May 2013, among other compatriots, Amir Abrashi, Vullnet Basha, Azdren Llullaku and Jurgen Gjasula, so he was able to play for Albania on international games. 
After an emergency for replacing Lorik Cana due to a suspend cause of number cards, Berisha had given the interest of coach Gianni De Biasi for him as choice for the game against Norway on 7 June 2013. He received a call-up by the national team's coach Gianni De Biasi for the match against Norway on 7 June 2013, but he was unused for that match and sat on the bench.

Due to an accord between the Albania's coach Gianni De Biasi and the Kosovo national football team's coach Albert Bunjaki, Berisha were called up for the first time at his birthplace country Kosovo for the friendly match against Oman on 7 September 2014. Berisha debuted for Kosovo by playing full 90 minutes in a 1–0 victory against Oman at Pristina City Stadium.

Career statistics

Club

International

References

External links

1991 births
Living people
Sportspeople from Pristina
Kosovo Albanians
Kosovan footballers
Kosovo international footballers
Albanian footballers
Association football defenders
FC Prishtina players
Örebro SK players
Gefle IF players
Flamurtari Vlorë players
Västerås SK Fotboll players
Football Superleague of Kosovo players
Ettan Fotboll players
Superettan players
Allsvenskan players
Kategoria Superiore players
Albanian expatriate footballers
Kosovan expatriate footballers
Albanian expatriate sportspeople in Sweden
Kosovan expatriate sportspeople in Sweden
Expatriate footballers in Sweden
Ljungskile SK players